21 Años Después (21 Years Later) (1989) is the sixth studio album by Mexican rock and blues band El Tri.

The title is a reference to the 21 years of career of Alex Lora since the creation of Three Souls on my Mind.

Track listing

Personnel 

 Alex Lora – guitar, vocals
 Rafael Salgado – harmonic
 Sergio Mancera – electric & rhythm guitar
 Hector "Virgo" Zenil;– drums
 Ruben Soriano – bass

External links
www.eltri.com.mx
21 Años Después, Alex Lora y El Tri at Musicbrainz
[ 21 Años Después, Alex Lora y El Tri] at Allmusic

El Tri albums
1989 albums
Warner Music Group albums
Spanish-language albums